TBHS can stand for:
Timaru Boys' High School, Canterbury, New Zealand
Todd Beamer High School, Washington, the United States
Troy Buchanan High School, Troy, Missouri, the United States
Taker Bazar High School, Taker Bazar, Begumganj, Noakhali, Bangladesh
The Bass Hosting Services, Hosting VPS, Chile